The Morning is the debut studio album by English musician Lewis Watson. It was released in 7 June 2014 under Warner Bros. It charted at number 28 in the UK Official Charts.

Track list

References

2014 debut albums